Z.Y. Fu, also known as Dze Nyoe Fu in Shanghainese or Fu Zaiyuan in Mandarin (1919 – August 26, 2011) was a Chinese-Japanese entrepreneur and philanthropist who founded the Sansaio Trading Corporation of Japan. The Fu Foundation School of Engineering and Applied Science of Columbia University in New York City is named after him, in recognition of his $26 million donation.

Biography 
Born and raised in Shanghai, Z.Y. Fu belonged to a family of 13 children. After graduating from St. John's University, he went to the Waseda University. In 1951, he founded the Sansaio Trading Corporation in Tokyo. In 1990 he set up the Fu Foundation to offer scholarships for Chinese students studying at Columbia University. He died in Hong Kong on August 26, 2011. His wife Joan Yun Chung Chu Fu (朱藴瓊) was born in 1932 and died in 2017. His estate is the subject of the Hong Kong civil litigation case Shochiro Satake v. Fu Chu, Yun Chung Joan with his wife being the Administratrix of the Estate of Fu Dze Yuen, deceased and in her personal capacity. Through marriage, he was also an in-law of Jerrold Meinwald (1927–2018), an American chemist known for co-founding the field of chemical ecology.

Columbia University 
Z.Y. Fu enrolled in the Columbia University School of General Studies to improve his English. The Columbia School of Engineering and Applied Science renamed to the "Fu Foundation School of Engineering and Applied Science" after Fu donated $26 million to the institution in 1997 (41.7 million in 2019). He was called "the mysterious businessman" for his low profile and the fact that he was not an alumnus of Columbia University.

Fu and his wife endowed The Fu Foundation Chair in applied mathematics, held by Professor Chia-Kun Chu. Additionally, in 1993 the Fu Foundation established a scholarship program that supported 62 students from China who graduated between 1995 and 2007, with the awards divided between Columbia Engineering and Columbia College. In 2012, several recipients of the Fu scholarships in return established the Fu Memorial Scholarship Fund, which supports five students from Columbia Engineering and Columbia College.

Fu's brother-in-law, Prof. Chia-Kun Chu, noted that Fu began giving to Columbia in 1989, when at age 70, he endowed a chair at the engineering school because he "wanted to do a good thing."

See also 
 Chinese people in New York City

References 

1919 births
2011 deaths
Businesspeople from Shanghai
Columbia University people
St. John's University, Shanghai alumni
Waseda University alumni
Chinese emigrants to Japan
Chinese philanthropists
20th-century philanthropists